Dundalk entered the 2019 season as the reigning League Champions and FAI Cup holders from 2018. They had a new management team of Vinny Perth and the returning John Gill, after Stephen Kenny (the manager since 2013) had resigned to accept the Republic of Ireland U-21 manager's role. The 2019 season was Dundalk's 11th consecutive season in the top tier of Irish football, their 84th in all, and their 93rd in the League of Ireland.

Season summary
The new season's curtain raiser - the President's Cup - was played on 9 February in Turners Cross (stadium) between Dundalk and Cork City, the runners-up in both league and cup the previous year. Dundalk won on a 2-1 scoreline. The 36 round League programme commenced on 15 February 2019, and was completed on 25 October 2019. Dundalk retained their title with four games to spare, sealing the title in Oriel Park with a 3–2 victory over Shamrock Rovers on 23 September 2019. They had already won the League Cup, defeating Derry City on penalties in the Brandywell nine days earlier. Chasing a domestic Treble, they were defeated in a penalty shoot-out in the FAI Cup final by Shamrock Rovers. But they ended the season with a comprehensive 7–1 aggregate victory over Northern Irish champions, Linfield, in the inaugural Champions Cup (All-Ireland) – bringing the trophy haul in Perth's rookie season to four.

In Europe Dundalk entered the 2019-20 UEFA Champions League first qualifying round. After being seeded in the draw, they faced Riga, drawing the home leg in Oriel Park 0-0. The away leg in Riga was the club's 70th match in European football, which also finished 0-0. After extra-time failed to separate the sides, they won 5–4 in a sudden-death penalty shootout – their first in Europe, becoming the first Irish side to win a tie in that manner. They were knocked out in the second qualifying round by Qarabağ when a 1–1 home draw was followed by a 3–0 defeat away in Baku, which saw them receive a bye into the Europa League Third qualifying round. Their interest in Europe for the season ended there, with a 4-1 aggregate defeat to Slovan Bratislava. Both Qarabağ and Slovan subsequently reached the group stage of the Europa League.

First-Team Squad (2019)
Sources:

Competitions

President's Cup
Source:

Premier Division

FAI Cup
Source:
First Round

Second Round

Quarter Final

Semi Final

Final

League Cup
Source:
Second Round

Quarter Final

Semi Final

Final

Champions Cup
Source:

Dundalk won 7–1 on aggregate.

Leinster Senior Cup
Source:
Fourth Round

Europe

Champions League
First qualifying round

0–0 on aggregate. Dundalk won 5–4 on penalties.

Second qualifying round

Qarabağ won 4–1 on aggregate.

Europa League
Third qualifying round

Awards

Player of the Month

SWAI Personality of the Year

SWAI Goalkeeper of the Year

Footnotes

References

Dundalk F.C. seasons
Dundalk